A sub-provincial division in China is a prefecture-level city governed by a province promoted by half a level. Thus, it is half a level under the provincial level (hence the name sub-provincial) but half a level above the prefecture-level. 

The promotion applies to all its subdivisions, administrative institutions, and political parties. For example, the mayor of a sub-provincial division is equal in status to a vice-governor of a province.

A sub-provincial division is still administratively governed by a province, just like prefecture-level divisions. However, five of them are also cities specifically designated in the state plan, which enjoy the provincial level authority over economic issues—governmental finance, customs, economic strategy planning, economic policy, foreign economic affairs, banking, etc.

Sub-provincial divisions, similar to prefectural-level divisions, are administrative units comprising, typically, a main central urban area (the core city) surrounded by rural area, which together are divided into districts, and some surrounding counties or county-level cities (all promoted to sub-prefecture level) governed by the sub-provincial division on behalf of the province, which all have their own urban areas surrounded by their own rural areas.

Map of sub-provincial level entries in China

Sub-provincial municipalities 
The original 16 municipalities were renamed as the sub-provincial municipalities on 25 February 1994 by the Central Organization Committee out of the prefecture-level municipalities. They are mostly the capitals of the provinces in which they are located.

Currently, there are 15 sub-provincial municipalities after Chongqing was designated direct-control:

Chongqing was formerly a sub-provincial municipality of Sichuan until 14 March 1997, when it was made an independent municipality by splitting it out of Sichuan altogether. The Xinjiang Production and Construction Corps also has the powers of a sub-provincial division.

Chengdu is the largest sub-provincial municipality. It has a population exceeding that of the independent municipality of Tianjin while both Harbin and Chengdu have a bigger land area than Tianjin.

In total, there are five sub-provincial municipalities that are not themselves provincial capitals. These five municipalities have been designated as the "Municipalities with Independent Planning Status".

Sub-provincial new areas 
Additionally, the head of Pudong New Area of Shanghai and Binhai New Area of Tianjin, which is a county-level district, is given sub-provincial powers.

Sub-provincial autonomous prefecture 
Ili Kazakh Autonomous Prefecture has both two prefectures of Altai and Tacheng and 11 directly-controlled county-level administrative divisions under its jurisdiction and in its legal status itself is only a prefecture-level division, which is a special case in China's administrative divisions. It is not accurate to regard Ili Kazakh Autonomous Region as a sub-provincial administrative division, which has no legal basis. Up until 2001, the Autonomous Prefecture had a 3rd prefecture as well. The directly controlled subdivisions were administered as part of Ili Prefecture (伊犁地区)

Sub-provincial Municipal Conference 
The National Joint Conference of Sub-provincial City People's Congress Standing Committee Chairpersons are attended by the chairpersons and vice-chairpersons of all sub-provincial cities. It was proposed by the Guangzhou Municipal People's Congress in 1985. The conferences:
 Guangzhou (26 February – 4 March 1985)
 Harbin (27–31 August 1985)
 Wuhan (20–24 May 1986)
 Dalian (10–14 August 1987)
 Xi'an (9–13 September 1988)
 Shenyang (13–17 August 1990)
 Chongqing (22–26 November 1991)
 Qingdao (3–7 May 1992)
 Shenzhen (25–28 October 1993)
 Nanjing (1–4 November 1994)
 Changchun (21–24 May 1995)
 Hangzhou (20–24 October 1996)
 Jinan (19–25 October 1997)
 Xiamen (12–16 October 1998)
 Ningbo (17–20 October 1999)
 Chengdu (10–13 October 2000)
 Guangzhou (30 October – 3 November 2001)
 Harbin (23–26 July 2002)
 Wuhan (8–12 October 2003)
 Shenyang (31 August – 6 September 2004)
 Qingdao (6–8 September 2005)
 Shenzhen (20–23 October 2006)
 Dalian (14–16 August 2007)
 Xi'an (13–16 April 2009)
 Nanjing (18–20 October 2010)
 Changchun (22–25 August 2011)

References 

 
Administrative divisions of China
Prefecture-level divisions of the People's Republic of China